The Youth Justice Board, for England and Wales (YJB) is a non-departmental public body created by the Crime and Disorder Act 1998 to oversee the youth justice system for England and Wales. It is sponsored by the Ministry of Justice, and its Board members are appointed by the Secretary of State for Justice. It also receives funding from the Home Office and the Department for Education. In November 2011 the government dropped plans, contained in the Public Bodies Bill, to abolish the Youth Justice Board.

Functions

The YJB's primary function is to monitor the operation of the youth justice system and the provision of youth justice services. Within England and Wales it is responsible for:

 using information and evidence to form an expert view of how to get the best outcomes for children who offend and for victims of crime
 advising the Secretary of State for Justice and those working in youth justice services about how well the system is operating, and how improvements can be made
 identifying and sharing best practice
 promoting the voice of the child
 commissioning research and publishing information in connection with good practice
 monitoring the youth justice system and the provision of youth justice services
 making grants, with the approval of the Secretary of State, for the purposes of the operation of the youth justice system and services
 providing information technology related assistance for the operation of the youth justice system and services. The main vehicle for this is the Youth Justice Application Framework (YJAF) which is a case management system collecting data utilised by the YJB for its Business Intelligence & Insights function, and information exchange between Youth Justice Services and the Secure Estate regarding children.

Board Members
Members of the YJB's Board are appointed by the Secretary of State for Justice. The following people are current YJB Board Members:
 Keith Fraser (Chair)
 Brian Tytherleigh
 Dr Gillian Fairfield
 Keith Towler
 Professor Neal Hazel
 Sharon Gray
 Susannah Hancock
 Louise Shorter
 Jacob Sakil

The YJB's current Chief Executive is Claudia Sturt.  The organisation has about 100 staff.

Chairs of the YJB
September 1998–June 2003 :  Lord Norman Warner
June 2003–April 2004 : Sir Charles Pollard (Acting)
April 2004–January 2007 : Rod Morgan
February 2007–February 2008 : Graham Robb (Interim)
February 2008–March 2014 : Frances Done
March 2014–February 2017 :  Lord Tom McNally
March 2017–April 2020 : Charlie Taylor
April 2020–Current : Keith Fraser

External links
Youth Justice Board
 YJB Publications

References

Prison-related organizations
Non-departmental public bodies of the United Kingdom government
Youth organisations based in the United Kingdom